Rui Pedro Teixeira Mendonça (born 28 January 1987) is a Portuguese child who went missing on 4 March 1998 in Lousada, northern Portugal. Mendonça was 11 years old and riding his bicycle outside near his home when he disappeared. The subsequent police investigation was criticized by both the media and by the missing boy's family. Mendonça's whereabouts remain unknown, and he was declared legally dead in 2019.

Last known activities
On 4 March 1998, at around 2:00 PM, Mendonça took his bicycle and cycled to his mother's workplace, located near the family home. He had asked his mother for permission to spend the afternoon riding in a car "with his friend Afonso" (Afonso Dias), a 22-year-old lorry driver. Mendonça's mother denied the request, and told him to go play in an abandoned lot outside her office.

Investigation 
Mendonça's tutor called his parents because the child had not turned up for his 5:00 PM lesson, and they quickly initiated a search for him. Because Mendonça had told his mother that he was planning to meet up with his friend Dias, the police sought him for questioning. Dias was in an emotional state while being questioned, and simply replied that he did not know the boy's whereabouts, but that the police "should close the borders". Mendonça's cousin, João André Mendonça, recounted to the police that he, Mendonça and Dias had had a conversation where Dias had invited them to go meet up with a prostitute. The cousin said he had not joined Mendonça and Dias that afternoon because his mother would not let him leave the house.

Sightings 

The investigation into the child's disappearance was slow to commence and soon slowed down further due to the lack of credible leads. Nevertheless, the case had sparked public interest to a degree that sightings of Mendonça were numerous over the years since his disappearance. A prostitute, Alcina Dias, confirmed that Dias had taken Mendonça to see her on the day he disappeared. Dias allegedly drove up to see her in his car and asked her if she was working. When she assented, he offered to pay her to have sex with Mendonça. Alcina Dias said that Mendonça was extremely nervous and crying by the time he exited the vehicle, reportedly saying that Dias had forced him to meet her. Alcina Dias added that she tried to calm the boy down and asked him if his mother knew he was there, to which the boy replied no. Mendonça then allegedly drove off in Dias' vehicle. Alcina Dias allegedly tried to give her deposition to the authorities, but could never identify Dias by name. In 2011, she finally identified him in a court of law.

In April 1998, the political commentator Nuno Rogeiro traveled to Disneyland Paris with his family. During the trip, the Rogeiro family snapped several photographs whilst on a ride; one of these photos depicts a boy sitting behind the family who reportedly looks remarkably like Mendonça. Sitting next to the boy was a man in his 40s wearing a red jacket. The Portuguese police did confiscate the photographs for further analysis, but no further progress was made regarding this sighting.

On 1 September 1998, 13 police forces raided alleged members of an international child pornography ring known as the Wonderland Club. The operation was code-named Operation Cathedral and resulted in the confiscation of 750,000 images and videos depicting 1,263 different children. Mendonça was among the few children (16 only) that could be identified. However, his whereabouts remain unknown and police suspect that he was murdered by his abductors after being abused on camera for other members of the paedophile ring.

Media coverage 
Mendonça's disappearance was widely covered by the Portuguese media and the case's developments continue to make headlines.

Prison sentence for Dias 

Dias' initial 2012 trial ended in an acquittal due to a lack of evidence, but he was subsequently charged with facilitating the corruption of a minor and convicted after a new trial in 2014. The second trial, which followed an appeal by Mendonça's family, focused on Dias' attempts to coerce Mendonça into having sex with a prostitute, and was unrelated to the child's disappearance. Despite Dias's appeal, this second ruling was upheld by the Supreme Court of Portugal. On 3 October 2014, Dias was sentenced to three years in prison. On 18 March  2015, he was taken to prison by his lawyer, after a warrant for his detention was issued by the police. Dias was released in March 2017, having served two thirds of his sentence, and continues to maintain his innocence in the matter.

See also
 Disappearance of Madeleine McCann
 Disappearance of Johnny Gosch
 List of people who disappeared

References

1987 births
1990s missing person cases
1998 crimes in Portugal
20th-century Portuguese people
Missing people
Missing person cases in Portugal
People from Lousada
Unsolved crimes in Portugal
Violence against men in Europe